Borstal Boy is a 1958 autobiographical book by Brendan Behan. The story depicts a young, fervently idealistic Behan, who loses his naïveté over the three years of his sentence to a juvenile borstal, softening his radical Irish republican stance and warming to his British fellow prisoners.   From a technical standpoint, the novel is chiefly notable for the art with which it captures the lively dialogue of the Borstal inmates, with a variety of the many subtly distinctive accents of Britain and Ireland intact on the page. Ultimately, Behan demonstrated by his skillful dialogue that working class Irish Catholics and English Protestants actually had more in common with one another through class than they had supposed, and that alleged barriers of religion and ethnicity were merely superficial and imposed by a fearful middle class.

The book was banned in Ireland for unspecified reasons in 1958; the ban expired in 1970.

Adaptations

In 1967, the story debuted as a play, adapted by Frank McMahon and staged at the Abbey Theatre in Dublin, with Frank Grimes as the young Behan. The play was a great success, winning McMahon a Tony Award for his adaptation. The play remains popular with both Irish and American audiences.

A film adaptation, Borstal Boy, was released in 2000, directed by Peter Sheridan and starring Shawn Hatosy and Danny Dyer. The Irish band Hothouse Flowers' song "The End of the Road" appeared in the soundtrack of the movie.

In 1973, the English rock band The Faces recorded a song about the book, which was included on their album Ooh La La.

The UK electropop group Chew Lips take their name from a character in the book.

The novel was reissued by David R. Godine, Publisher in 2000.

References

External links
 
 

1958 novels
Irish autobiographical novels
Book censorship in the Republic of Ireland
Irish novels adapted into films
Novels by Brendan Behan
Novels set in England
Irish political novels
20th-century Irish novels
Censored books
Hutchinson (publisher) books